John Abdulai  Jinapor born (June 8, 1979) is a Ghanaian politician and a former Minister of State of Ghana. He is a member of the  National Democratic Congress of Ghana and a Member of Parliament representing the Yapei-Kusawgu constituency.

Education 
Jinapor attended Ghana Senior High School in Tamale. He had his master's degree in Development Finance from the University of Ghana in 2019. Post Graduate Diploma in Finance and Financial Law from the University of London in 2015. Masters of Science in Energy Economics from the Ghana Institute of Management and Public Administration (GIMPA) in 2021. Bachelor's degree from the University for Development Studies, Master's degree in marketing at the University of Ghana, 2008.

Political career 
He was appointed Deputy Minister of Energy under the John Mahama administration. He is member of the Seventh Parliament of the Fourth Republic of Ghana representing the Yapei Kusawgu Constituency in the Northern Region on the ticket of the National Democratic Congress.

Personal life 
Jinapor was born to Abudulai Jinapor, a former police officer and Chief of Buipe in the Savanna Region of Ghana. He is the brother of Samuel Abu Jinapor, former deputy Chief of Staff of Ghana and the current minister of Land and Natural Resources. and Dr. Ahmed Jinapor, a lecturer. He is married to Mrs. Josephine Jinapor, .

References 

Living people
National Democratic Congress (Ghana) politicians
Alumni of the University of London
University for Development Studies alumni
University of Ghana alumni
People from Northern Region (Ghana)
1979 births
Ghanaian MPs 2021–2025
Ghana Senior High School (Tamale) alumni